Eucalyptus notactites, commonly known as southern limestone mallee, is a species of mallee that is endemic to the southwest of Western Australia. It has smooth, greyish bark, lance-shaped adult leaves, flower buds in groups of between eleven and fifteen, creamy white flowers and hemispherical fruit.

Description
It has smooth, white and pale grey bark that is shed in strips, revealing reddish tan new bark. Flowering mainly occurs from November to January and the flowers are creamy white.

Taxonomy and naming
Southern limestone mallee was first formally described in 1992 by Lawrie Johnson and Ken Hill and given the name Eucalyptus goniantha subsp. notactites. The description was published in the journal Telopea, from specimens collected near the Mount Melville garbage tip in 1986. In 2012, Dean Nicolle and Malcolm French raised the subspecies to species level as E. notactites. The specific epithet (notactites) is from the Greek notos, meaning "the south" and aktites meaning "a watcher", referring to the species occurring on the coast, facing the southern ocean.

Distribution and habitat
Eucalyptus notactites grows in often dense mallee shrubland along the coast between the Flinders Peninsula in Torndirrup National Park and Cape Arid National Park, including some offshore islands.

Conservation status
This eucalypt is classified as "not threatened" by the Government of Western Australia Department of Parks and Wildlife.

References

notactites
Eucalypts of Western Australia
Myrtales of Australia
Plants described in 1992
Taxa named by Lawrence Alexander Sidney Johnson
Taxa named by Ken Hill (botanist)